Hugo Botermans (born 2 March 2000) is a Dutch former professional footballer who plays as a forward.

Club career
Hugo Botermans played in the youth of FC Zoetermeer, Alphense Boys and ADO Den Haag.

Jong ADO and FC Eindhoven 
In 2019, Jong ADO Den Haag joined the KNVB football pyramid and Botermans played with that team for a season in the Derde Divisie. During 20 caps at Jong ADO, he scored 11 goals.

He was loaned to FC Eindhoven in the 2020–21 season. He made his debut in professional football for Eindhoven on August 28, 2020 in a 1–2 away victory against Jong FC Utrecht. Botermans replaced Alef João in the 65th minute and forced the penalty that resulted in the winning goal. The following week, in the 2–3 loss against SC Telstar, he scored a 1–1 equalizer as his first goal in professional football. In total, he scored 8 goals in 36 caps. At the end of the Eindhoven season, the contract of Botermans with ADO expired.

Excelsior, Katwijk, and ASWH 
During a trial period at FC Den Bosch, he scored in an unofficial game against Nivo Sparta. In September 2021, Botermans joined Excelsior Rotterdam on a free transfer. He had 8 Eerste Divisie caps, all as a substitute and without scoring goals. He did open in two National Cup games and scored twice. Botermans and Excelsior agreed to separate in the winter break of 2021.

On 31 January 2022, Botermans signed a 1.5-year contract with VV Katwijk in the Tweede Divisie. Late August 2022, Botermans suffered an ankle injury in a tournament game against Koninklijke HFC. He recovered and separated from Katwijk in December 2022. At Katwijk he had 26 caps, scoring 2 goals.

On 16 December 2022, Botermans signed a new 1.5-year contract with the Hendrik-Ido-Ambacht-side ASWH in the Derde Divisie.

References

External links 
 
 

2000 births
Living people
Dutch footballers
Footballers from Delft
Association football forwards
ADO Den Haag players
Alphense Boys players
ASWH players
FC Eindhoven players
Excelsior Rotterdam players
VV Katwijk players
Eerste Divisie players
Tweede Divisie players
Derde Divisie players